This is a list of the National Register of Historic Places listings in Gray County, Texas.

This is intended to be a complete list of properties listed on the National Register of Historic Places in Gray County, Texas. There are eight properties and districts listed on the National Register in the county. Four of these properties are also Recorded Texas Historic Landmarks.

Current listings

The locations of National Register properties may be seen in a mapping service provided.

|}

See also

National Register of Historic Places listings in Texas
Recorded Texas Historic Landmarks in Gray County

References

External links

Registered Historic Places
Gray County
Buildings and structures in Gray County, Texas